Daniel Kirkwood (born Edinburgh, Scotland; 28 May 1867 - 23 December 1928) was a former football player, director, and chairman (during the 1909-10 season) of Everton.

External links
Daniel Kirkwood - The Director Years
Daniel Kirkwood - Footballer and Director

Everton F.C. players
English football chairmen and investors
Everton F.C. directors and chairmen
Footballers from Edinburgh
1867 births
1928 deaths
Association footballers not categorized by position
Scottish footballers